Silke Launert (born 27 December 1976) is a German judge and politician of the Christian Social Union (CSU) who has been serving as a member of the Bundestag from the state of Bavaria since 2013. She represents Bayreuth.

Political career 
Launert first became a member of the Bundestag after the 2013 German federal election. She was a member of the Committee for Family, Senior Citizens, Women and Youth from 2013 until 2021 before moving to the Committee on Internal Affairs and the Budget Committee in 2021. Since 2022, she has been chairing the Budget Committee’s Subcommittee on European Affairs.

In the negotiations to form a fourth coalition government under the leadership of Chancellor Angela Merkel following the 2017 federal elections, Launert was part of the working group on families, women, seniors and youth, led by Annette Widmann-Mauz, Angelika Niebler and Katarina Barley.

Other activities 
 Federal Agency for Civic Education (BPB), Member of the Board of Trustees (since 2022)
 Evangelical Church in Germany (EKD), Member of the Committee on Migration and Integration (since 2016)

Political positions
In June 2017, Launert abstained from a parliamentary vote on Germany's introduction of same-sex marriage.

References

External links 

  
 Bundestag biography 

1976 births
Living people
Members of the Bundestag for Bavaria
Female members of the Bundestag
21st-century German women politicians
Members of the Bundestag 2021–2025
Members of the Bundestag 2017–2021
Members of the Bundestag 2013–2017
People from Stadtsteinach
Members of the Bundestag for the Christian Social Union in Bavaria

People from Bayreuth